Josh Maveety (born November 29, 1988, in Kingston, Ontario) is a former professional Canadian football punter and placekicker for the Hamilton Tiger-Cats of the Canadian Football League. After finishing his CIS eligibility with the Bishop's Gaiters, he signed as an undrafted free agent with the Tiger-Cats on June 20, 2011.

References

1988 births
Living people
Bishop's Gaiters football players
Canadian football placekickers
Canadian football punters
Hamilton Tiger-Cats players
Players of Canadian football from Ontario
Sportspeople from Kingston, Ontario